Michele Rocca (1671-died after 1751) was an Italian painter of the Baroque period. He was born in Parma and practised in Rome, and died some time after 1751. He was also called Parmigianino the younger or Michele da Parma. He worked in the manner of Pietro da Cortona.

References

1671 births
1750s deaths
Painters from Parma
17th-century Italian painters
Italian male painters
18th-century Italian painters
Italian Baroque painters
18th-century Italian male artists